The Thinning is a 2016 American social science fiction thriller web film directed by Michael Gallagher and starring Logan Paul, Peyton List, Lia Marie Johnson, Calum Worthy, Matthew Glave, Michael Traynor, and Stacey Dash. The film is set in a dystopian future in which population control is enforced through a school aptitude test; those who fail it are executed.

The film received a lukewarm reception from critics, though audience reception was more positive. Praise focused on the performances of Paul and List, concept and interesting themes but was criticized for not taking full advantage of its premise.

Plot
In 2039, due to Earth's human overpopulation, the United Nations instructs all nations to annually cut their populations by 5%. The United States implements the 10-241 or "the Thinning", a standardized test in which those who fail will be executed.

Blake Redding, son of Texas governor Dean Redding, is dating a girl named Ellie Harper, neither of whom study for the exam. Blake passes the exams, while Ellie fails. Blake calls his father in an attempt to free Ellie, but he refuses.

On the day of his last exam a year later, Blake makes a video saying that he will purposefully fail his exam to test his father's loyalty. Redding takes notice of this announcement, and test manager Mason King, also head of the Department of Population Control, is ordered to pass Blake regardless of his score. Mason switches his score with genius classmate Laina Michaels, passing Blake at her expense. Suspicious, a teacher named Ms. Birch secretly hands Laina a keycard so she can unlock the doors and escape. Blake cuts the school's power, allowing Laina to escape. That, however, is hindered by the school initiating lockdown. After using the keycard, Laina meets up with Blake.

After a series of escapades with the guards, Laina goes to the server room to check the scores, learning that test scores are shuffled, resulting in the wrongful deaths of many students with passing scores. Laina gives it to her friend Kellan, who is acquainted with a news anchor. The power is turned on, and Laina is caught on camera, thus taken to the Thinning. Blake, still in the disguise, attempts to release all the failed students, but is caught by the guards. After photos of the system's misconduct are leaked, Redding reluctantly executes all of those who actually failed, including Blake, by injection. As the lockdown ends, Laina is reunited with her younger sister Corrine as well as Ms. Birch, who has been taking care of Corrine since their mother's death.

Blake and the rest are taken underground, where many people are working for tech company Assuru Global. As Blake slowly wakes up from what was actually a sleep drug, he sees a blonde girl working: Ellie.

Cast
Logan Paul as Blake Redding
Peyton List as Laina Michaels
Lia Marie Johnson as Ellie Harper
Calum Worthy as Kellan Woods
Ryan Newman as Sarah Foster
Michael Traynor as Mason King
Stacey Dash as Kendra Birch
Matthew Glave as Gov. Dean Redding
Robert Gant as Vince Davi
Kiersten Warren as Barbara Michaels
Jana Winternitz as Ms. Cole
Patrick O’Sullivan as Mr. P. Glass
Amy Paffrath as Wendy Banks
Jeff Corbett as Victor Woods
Laura Harring as Georgina Preston
Aria Leabu as Corrine Michaels
Marcel Nahapetian as Joey Michaels

Reception
Adi Robertson of The Verge gave a negative review of the film, describing it, in comparison to other films about teenagers forced into a deadly competition, as "remarkable simply for being such a bad take on the formula."

Sequel

On November 17, 2017, Logan Paul announced on his YouTube channel that a sequel, titled The Thinning: New World Order was starting production.

On January 10, 2018, YouTube announced that production of New World Order was put on hold, as part of repercussions instated upon Paul for posting a controversial video in which he visited Aokigahara, a Japanese forest known for being a common place for suicides to occur, and filmed a dead body. This sparked outrage across social media against Paul, forcing an apology from himself and repercussions from YouTube, including delaying The Thinning: New World Order and his appearance in the upcoming season of YouTube Red series Foursome, but the criticism still continues.

On October 16, 2018, Logan Paul released the trailer for The Thinning: New World Order. On October 17, Paul premiered The Thinning: New World Order to the public.

References

External links
 
 
 

2010s science fiction films
2010s thriller films
American science fiction thriller films
American dystopian films
Films set in 2041
Films set in the future
Overpopulation fiction
YouTube Premium films
Films set in Austin, Texas
2010s English-language films
Films directed by Michael J. Gallagher
2010s American films
Logan Paul